Thomas McGowan (born July 26, 1959) is an American actor. He first became known for his stage career both on and off Broadway. In 1991, he was nominated for the Tony Award for Best Actor in a Play and the Drama Desk Award for Outstanding Actor in a Play for his Broadway debut performance in La Bête. In 2011, McGowan was chosen to step into the role of the Wizard in Wicked on Broadway. In 2014, McGowan starred in Harvey Fierstein's original Broadway play, Casa Valentina which was nominated for the Tony Award for Best Play. Since then he has appeared in the Broadway revivals of She Loves Me (2016) and Kiss Me Kate (2019).

He is also known for his recurring role on the Emmy Award winning NBC show Frasier, as KACL station manager Kenny Daly. He has also appeared on a variety of shows including Everybody Loves Raymond, The Practice, ER, Desperate Housewives, Curb Your Enthusiasm, Modern Family, Veep and The Good Fight.

He has appeared in films such as Heavyweights, Sleepless in Seattle, The Birdcage, As Good as It Gets, True Crime, Ghost World, and Bad Santa.

Career
On Broadway he appeared in La Bête (1991), for which he received a Tony Award nomination for Best Actor in a Play. Off Broadway, he won an Obie Award for his performance in Nicky Silver's play The Food Chain. He played the role of Pat Finley in the 1995 movie Heavyweights and the role of Patrick Fisher in the 2006 movie Twelve and Holding.

McGowan has been performing the role of The Wonderful Wizard of Oz in various companies of Wicked since 2009. He first played the Wizard in the original Second National Tour production, beginning March 7, 2009. He finished with the touring company on December 6, 2009, transferring to the San Francisco production, playing the Wizard from December 22, 2009 through September 5, 2010, when the production closed. He then returned to the Second National Tour, resuming performances on January 11, 2011 and concluding his performances on the tour on April 17, 2011.

McGowan joined the Broadway company of the show from May 3, 2011 through February 5, 2012. Thereafter, he moved to the show's First National Tour, playing the role from August 2012 through April 2013. He has since performed the role on Broadway intermittently, including from August 13, 2013 through February 22, 2014, and onward from July 15, 2014.

McGowan played the role in the West End production of the show from September 21, 2015 through March 12, 2016.

McGowan was in the 2016 Broadway revival of She Loves Me as Ladislav Sipos.

Personal life
McGowan grew up in Belmar, New Jersey. He graduated from Belmar's St. Rose High School in 1977. Upon graduation from high school, he attended Hofstra University and the Yale School of Drama, from which he graduated with a Master of Fine Arts degree in 1988. He and his wife, Cathy, have a son, Mark (born May 5, 1992) and a daughter, Mary (born February 10, 1995).

Filmography

Film

Television

Theatre

Awards and nominations

References

External links

1959 births
Male actors from New Jersey
American male film actors
American male television actors
Hofstra University alumni
Living people
People from Belmar, New Jersey
St. Rose High School alumni
Yale School of Drama alumni
20th-century American male actors
21st-century American male actors